Provincial Road 214 (PR 214), also called Milner Ridge Road, is a short provincial road in the province of Manitoba, Canada.  It runs through the Agassiz Provincial Forest from PTH 44 at Seddons Corner (east of Beausejour) to PTH 11.

PR 214 provides access to the Milner Ridge Correction Facility, a medium and minimum-security prison operated by the Manitoba Department of Justice.  The prison is located on the former CFS Beausejour site, which was a NORAD surveillance base.  PR 214 also serves as a shortcut for those traveling between Beausejour and Lac Du Bonnet via PTH 44 and PTH 11.

Route History
PR 214 was originally part of PTH 11 before its current configuration was completed and opened to traffic in 1955.

References

External links
Official Manitoba Highway Map

214